José de Jesús Sahagún de la Parra (born 1 January 1922) is a Mexican prelate of the Roman Catholic Church. Sahagún de la Parra was born in Cotija, Mexico and was ordained a priest on May 26, 1946. Parra was appointed bishop to the Tula Diocese on May 22, 1961, and ordained bishop on September 8, 1961. Parra's last appointment was to the Diocese of Ciudad Lázaro Cárdenas on September 11, 1985. He resigned on May 3, 1993. He turned 100 in January 2022. He is the oldest living Roman Catholic bishop.

See also
Diocese of Ciudad Lázaro Cárdenas
Diocese of Tula

References

External links
Catholic-Hierarchy

1922 births
Living people
20th-century Roman Catholic bishops in Mexico
Participants in the Second Vatican Council
People from Cotija de la Paz
Men centenarians
Mexican centenarians